The following is a list of winners of the Golden Calf for best Production Design at the Nederlands Film Festival. This category has been awarded since 2003.

 2022 Masha Halberstad - Oink
 2021 Hubert Pouille - The Forgotten Battle
 2020 Anne Winterink - Marionette
 2019 Kurt Loyens - Amsterdam Vice
 2018 Harry Ammerlaan - The Resistance Banker
 2017 Floris Vos - Brimstone
 2016 Ben Zuydwijk - J. Kessels
 2015 Hubert Pouille - The Surprise
 2014 Alfred Schaaf - Hemel op aarde
 2013 Lieke Scholman - Wolf
 2012 Wilbert van Dorp - The Heineken Kidnapping
 2011 Gert Brinkers - Dik Trom
 2010 Vincent de Pater - Lang en gelukkig
 2009 Floris Vos - Winter in Wartime
 2008 Elsje de Bruijn - TBS
 2007 Maarten Piersma – Nightwatching
 2006 Gert Brinkers – Ober
 2005 The production design-team of Lepel & Gert Brinkers – Lepel
 2004 Marco Rooth – De Dominee
 2003 Benedict Schillemans – Pietje Bell

Sources
 Golden Calf Awards (Dutch)
 NFF Website

Best Production Design